The Dunedin Fine Arts Center (DFAC) hosts exhibitions, festivals, classes, and workshop space in Dunedin, Florida. The centar was temporary closed due to COVID-19 pandemic and was re-opened on June 1, 2020.

References

External links
 

Arts centers in Florida
Museums in Pinellas County, Florida
Children's museums in Florida
Buildings and structures in Dunedin, Florida